David Alan Nicholls (born 30 November 1966) is a British novelist and screenwriter.

Early life and education
Nicholls is the middle of three siblings. He attended Barton Peveril College at Eastleigh, Hampshire, taking A-levels in Drama, English Literature, Physics and Biology. 

He also took part in college drama productions, playing a wide range of roles. He went onto study at the University of Bristol, graduating with a BA in Drama and English in 1988. 

He later trained as an actor at the American Musical and Dramatic Academy in New York.

First career
Throughout his 20s, he worked as an actor, using the stage name David Holdaway. He played small roles at various theatres, including the West Yorkshire Playhouse and, for a three-year period, at the Royal National Theatre. He struggled as an actor and has said "I’d committed myself to a profession for which I lacked not just talent and charisma, but the most basic of skills. Moving, standing still – things like that." Nicholls says that a turning point in his career came when a friend gave him a copy of PJ Kavanagh’s memoir The Perfect Stranger, which tells the author's own tale of maturation, finding love, and discovering his path in life.

Writing career

Novels
Starter for Ten (2003)
The Understudy (2005)
One Day (2009)
Us (2014)
Sweet Sorrow (2019)

Screenwriting
Nicholls co-wrote the adapted screenplay of Simpatico and contributed four scripts to the third series of Cold Feet (both 2000). For the latter, he was nominated for a British Academy Television Craft Award for Best New Writer (Fiction). He created the Granada Television pilot and miniseries I Saw You (2000, 2002) and the Tiger Aspect six-part series Rescue Me (2002). Rescue Me lasted for only one series before being cancelled. Nicholls had written four episodes for the second series before being told of the cancellation. His anger over this led to him taking a break from screenwriting to concentrate on writing Starter for Ten. When he returned to screenwriting, he adapted Much Ado About Nothing into a one-hour segment of the BBC's 2005 ShakespeaRe-Told season. For this, he was nominated for the British Academy Television Award for Best Single Drama. He wrote a screen adaptation of his novel, One Day, which was made into a film starring Anne Hathaway and Jim Sturgess.

In 2006, his film adaptation Starter for 10 was released in cinemas. The following year, he wrote And When Did You Last See Your Father?, an adaptation of the memoir by Blake Morrison. His adaptation of Tess of the D'Urbervilles for the BBC aired in 2008. He has also adapted Great Expectations; the screenplay has been listed on the 2009 Brit List, an annual industry poll of the best unmade scripts outside the United States. He wrote The 7.39, which was broadcast on BBC One in January 2014.

In 2015, he wrote the screenplay of Far from the Madding Crowd for BBC Films of Thomas Hardy's 1874 novel of the same name. It is the fourth film adaptation of the novel.

Nicholls worked on the initial script for Bridget Jones's Baby (2016) but the script was re-written and he was not credited in the film. He wrote Patrick Melrose (2018), a five-part television series based on Edward St Aubyn's novels, and received a nomination for the Primetime Emmy Award for Outstanding Writing for a Limited Series, Movie, or Dramatic Special for his work on the show.

Aftersun
In 2005, he wrote Aftersun for the Old Vic's 24-Hour Play festival. The play, starring James Nesbitt, Saffron Burrows, Catherine Tate and Gael García Bernal was just 10 minutes long. Nicholls developed Aftersun into a one-off comedy for BBC One. It starred Peter Capaldi and Sarah Parish and was broadcast in 2006.

Awards and honours

In 2015, Nicholls was awarded an honorary DLitt from The University of Edinburgh. In 2016, he returned to the University of Bristol to receive the award of an honorary DLitt.

2010 Galaxy Book of the Year Award for One Day
2014 Specsavers National Book Awards "UK Author of the Year" winner for Us
2016 Honorary DLitt from the University of Bristol

References

Further reading
 Nicholls, David (19 March 2005). "The invisible man". The Guardian.
 Nicholls, David (31 October 2006). "I was a bit of a prat". The Guardian.

External links

 Official website
 David Nicholls at Curtis Brown Literary and Talent Agency
 'An Interview with David Nicholls' in the Oxonian Review

1966 births
Living people
Alumni of the University of Bristol
Alumni of the Royal Central School of Speech and Drama
21st-century English novelists
English screenwriters
English male screenwriters
English television writers
English male novelists
British male television writers
21st-century British screenwriters
21st-century English male writers
People from Eastleigh